Vertex, Incorporated is a tax compliance software and services company based in King of Prussia, Pennsylvania, USA.

Vertex was founded in 1978 by Ray Westphal. Jeff Westphal, Stevie Westphal Thompson and Amanda Westphal Radcliffe purchased interest in the company from their father in 2000. On July 29, 2020, the company went public on the Nasdaq stock exchange.

References

Companies based in Montgomery County, Pennsylvania
American companies established in 1978
Companies listed on the Nasdaq
Software companies of the United States